Enboodhoo as a place name may refer to:
 Enboodhoo (Alif Dhaal Atoll) (Republic of Maldives)
 Enboodhoo (Baa Atoll) (Republic of Maldives)
 Enboodhoo (Kaafu Atoll) (Republic of Maldives)